State Route 519 (SR 519) is an east–west state highway situated in eastern Ohio, a U.S. state.

Found exclusively in the southeastern portion of Harrison County, State Route 519 was first designated in the late 1930s.  While predominantly a winding rural two-lane highway, State Route 519 serves the community of New Athens, where it intersects State Route 9.

Route description
The entirety of State Route 519 is situated within the southeastern quadrant of Harrison County.  There is no portion of this state route that is inclusive within the National Highway System.

History
State Route 519 made its first appearance in 1937 along the routing between U.S. Route 22 and U.S. Route 250 that it occupies to this day.  No significant changes have taken place to the routing of State Route 519 since its designation.

Major intersections

References

519
Transportation in Harrison County, Ohio